Roy Porter Wilcox (June 30, 1873 – May 20, 1946) was a member of the Wisconsin State Senate.

Biography
Wilcox was born in Eau Claire, Wisconsin in 1873. He was admitted to the bar in 1896, and graduated from Cornell Law School in 1897. He suffered a serious scalp wound in 1917 while dining at a restaurant. Wilcox died at Sacred Heart Hospital in Eau Claire following a short illness in 1946.

Political career
Wilcox was a member of the Senate from 1917 to 1920. He was twice a candidate for the Republican nomination for Governor of Wisconsin, in 1918 and 1920. In 1925, he was a candidate for the Republican nomination for the United States Senate in a special election following the death of Robert M. La Follette, Sr. He lost to La Follette's son, Robert M. La Follette, Jr.

References

External links

Politicians from Eau Claire, Wisconsin
Republican Party Wisconsin state senators
Wisconsin lawyers
Cornell Law School alumni
1873 births
1946 deaths